Sierra Fellers (born December 30, 1986, in Whitefish, Montana) is a professional skateboarder, who skates for Mystery Skateboards, Keystreet Clothing Company, Grizzly Griptape, Venture Trucks, Bones Wheels, Rpm Auto Sales, Vestal Watches, Spirit Skateshop (of Kalispell, Montana) and CCS magazine. He was featured in the Foundation Video Cataclysmic Abyss and the C1RCA Video "It's Time".

References

1986 births
Living people
American skateboarders
People from Whitefish, Montana